Softwire may refer to:
 Softwire (protocol), a type of network tunneling protocol
 The Softwire, a series of young adult science fiction novels